SK Infosec Co., Ltd. (commonly known as SK infosec) is a South Korea information security company established in 2000. It is a member of FIRST, having joined in 2005. The company is an affiliate of SK group, a South Korean business group. Its revenue comes from energy and chemical production, IT and telecommunication, and semiconductors. SK Infosec provides security consulting, managed security services, enterprise security solution, convergence security, and customer service.

SK Infosec entered into a partnership agreement with CounterTack in 2013, and has signed an MOU with IBM to cooperate on cloud security services.

References

Energy companies of South Korea
Information technology companies of South Korea